David Lee Stone (born 1978), is an English fantasy author best known for his series of books The Illmoor Chronicles. He has also written under the pseudonyms David L. Stone, David Grimstone and Rotterly Ghoulstone.

His books have been published in many countries and in several different languages. His publishers include Disney (US), Sony (Japan), Buena Vista (Italy), Hodder Headline (UK), Penguin Razorbill (USA), Open Road Integrated Media (USA), Instars Multimedia (China), Luitingh & Sithoff (Holland), Rocco (Brazil), Toymania (Russia), Pocket Jeunesse (France) and Baumhaus Verlag (Germany).

Agents
Between 1999 and 2014, David was represented by renowned literary agents Ed Victor Ltd, choosing the company specifically because they represented the estate of his hero, the late Douglas Adams. He left the agency in 2014 when his personal friend and long-term rights agent, Sophie Hicks (then Managing Director of the company), left to establish her own agency. Since 2014, he has been represented by Sophie as part of The Sophie Hicks Agency.

Early work
David started writing at the age of 10 and was submitting manuscripts to publishers by the time he was 13. His first ever appearance in print was in the letters section of the science fiction comic 2000 AD in April 1993, and his first short story "The Dulwich Assassins" was published in Xenos magazine during April 1997.

David soon began to write short stories, review columns and articles for many different magazines. Between 1997 and 2002, his work appeared in Interzone, SFX, Games Workshop's Citadel Journal, The Edge and many others. "The Dulwich Assassins" was reprinted in Knights of Madness, a fantasy anthology edited by Peter Haining that also contained stories by Terry Pratchett and Tom Sharpe.

The Illmoor Chronicles
(2003-2014)
In 2002, David's agent sold the first three books of his Illmoor Chronicles to UK publishing giant Hodder Headline. The series, which David had started creating in note-form when he was just 12 years old, went on to sell to Disney in the US, Sony in Japan and also in China, Russia, Japan, France, Italy, Brazil, Greece, Norway, Netherlands and Thailand.

The Ratastrophe Catastrophe (2003)
The Yowler Foul-up (2004)
The Shadewell Shenanigans (2005)
The Dwellings Debacle (2006)
The Vanquish Vendetta (2006)
The Coldstone Conflict (2007)

In 2014, it was announced that the full series would be released on ebook in the USA by Open Road Integrated Media on 25 February 2014 and in the UK by Hodder Children's Books on 14 April 2014.

Davey Swag
(2008)
A pirate fantasy novel published in the UK only by Hodder Children's Books.

The Gladiator Boy Series
(2009-2010)
The first six books of David's 'Gladiator Boy' franchise were released as the first series in July, 2009. The first three books of the second series were released in February 2010, and the second three in April. Another three books were released in July, beginning the third series. The books were published in the UK by Hodder Children's Books and in the USA by Penguin Razorbill.

Series 1(2009):
1. A Hero's Quest
2. Escape from Evil
3. Stowaway Slaves
4. The Rebels' Assault
5. Rescue Mission
6. The Blade of Fire

Series 2(2010):
7. The Living Dead
8. The Raging Torrent
9. The Three Ninjas
10. The Insane Fury
11. The White Snake
12. The Golem Army

Series 3(2010):
13. The Screaming Void
14. The Clone Warriors
15. The Ultimate Evil

It was announced in 2014 that the full series would be rebranded and repackaged by Hodder Children's Books into omnibus editions. These new versions will be published on 5 March 2014 in the UK.

The Undead Ed Series
(2011-2012)
The Undead Ed series was first released in May 2011. The three titles were published by Hodder Children's Books in the UK, Penguin Razorbill in the USA and are forthcoming from Baumhaus Verlag in Germany, due Summer 2015. In the USA, the series is written under Stone's 'Rotterly Ghoulstone' pseudonym.

1. Undead Ed and the Howling Moon (2011)
2. Undead Ed and the Demon Freakshow (2011)
3. Undead Ed and the Devil's Fingers (Undead Ed and the Fingers of Doom in the USA) (2012)

The Outcasts Series
(2016-2017)

The Outcasts series was first released in May 2016 as a trilogy of UK, mass-market paperbacks. All three are published by Hodder Children's Books, who hold exclusive World Rights to the series. The books are written under the 'David Grimstone' pseudonym.

1. Outcasts: The Game (2016)
2. Outcasts: Thunderbolt (2017)
3. Outcasts: Fire (2017)

Current Work
Between November 2013 and May 2016, Stone wrote the comedy parenting/lifestyle blog 'Bloke Called Dave' in preparation for a non-fiction title on the same subject.
In 2022 David launched his own independent publishing company with his wife Chiara, Kingsbrook Publishing. 
Kingsbrook Publishing has released three titles to date, Shadow of the Shapeshifter, Curse of the Kingslayer and The Venom of Vanquish.
www.kingsbrookpublishing.co.uk

Personal life
David was born at QEQM Hospital on 25 January 1978 in Margate, Kent, England. He (occasionally) attended St George's Church of England Foundation School in Broadstairs.

To date, David has written numerous books: six volumes of The Illmoor Chronicles, the Gladiator Boy series, the pirate-fantasy novel, Davey Swag, Undead Ed, the Outcasts and the Vanquish Trilogy.

In addition to writing novels, David has performed at the Hay and Edinburgh Book Festivals. He has also worked in Bulgaria for the British Council, reading his works and talking about story-creation with teenagers in Sofia. He was a Guest of Honour for Disney Hyperion at the 2004 Book Expo America in Chicago, USA.

David currently lives in the town of Ramsgate in England. He is married to designer Chiara Stone, creator of the pet brand, Hoobynoo (hoobynoo.co.uk). The couple have two children
</ref>

Bibliography

Books

Short Stories
"The Dulwich Assassins" (in Knights of Madness, Souvenir/Orbit 1998)
"The Lickspittle Leviathan" (in Shoal: A Thanet Writers Anthology, Thanet Writers 2018)

External links
The David Lee Stone official website
The Gladiator Boy website

References

People from Margate
1978 births
Living people